Zalakeh-ye Farajollah-e Montazeri (also Romanized as Zālakeh-ye Farajollāh-e Montaz̧erī; also known as Dālakeh-ye Ḩājjī Faraj, Z̄ālakeh, Z̄ālakeh-ye Ḩājī Faraj, Zalekeh, and Z̄ālkeh-ye Ḩājjī Faraj) is a village in Mahidasht Rural District, Mahidasht District, Kermanshah County, Kermanshah Province, Iran. At the 2006 census, its population was 62, in 11 families.

References 

Populated places in Kermanshah County